Fat Choi Spirit is a 2002 Hong Kong comedy film produced and directed by Johnnie To and Wai Ka-fai, and starring Andy Lau, Lau Ching-wan, Louis Koo, Gigi Leung and Cherrie In.

The film is a comedy, falling into the peculiar Hong Kong genre of Mahjong films, and was released during the Lunar New Year of 2002.

Plot
Andy is an extremely compulsive Mahjong player. Thrown out of the house by his mother and ignored by his more academically gifted and successful younger brother, Louis, he had a hard time running away from debt collectors. One day he met a woman named Gigi after a run-in with some of the debt collectors' men. Gigi started out as a thief, but because she fell for him and gave him immense luck, Andy gained great success with his extreme good luck in mahjong games and became very rich.

However, he refused to marry Gigi because she, though a nice woman when with him, was a sore loser who threw temper tantrums when on the verge of losing mahjong games. She could not understand that he couldn't stand the way she behaved. As Andy said, her behaviour could be revealed by just playing a game of mahjong where when she lost: She would throw the tables. He promised her that he would marry her if she could play a game of mahjong without such a bad temper. She couldn't and so he couldn't marry her though he loved her.

In the meantime, Andy found his mother who was now suffering from Alzheimer's disease. His brother faced bankruptcy and moved in with Andy, who lived in a bungalow. Not wanting to lose out in finding a job, Louis who had excellent luck in mahjong but zero skill, was conned out of all his money and even his clothes by a skilled, devious mahjong player, Sean (portrayed by Lau Ching-wan). A kind-hearted simpleton, a woman on the con team, (Cherrie) fell for him and decided to mend her ways.

Gigi, who was very disappointed with Andy's refusal to marry her, went with the bad crowd, in the form of the mahjong con men led by Sean. Andy who was cursed by Gigi lost his winning streak and instead found a living as a taxi driver; he moved into public housing. Being ever optimistic, he did not complain. However, not wanting Gigi to fall into the con men's trap, he played a game of mahjong with Sean and lost terribly. Gigi was touched by his actions and went back to him, promising she will return a better woman. Before she left, she gave Andy a blessing and, from there on, Andy's winning streak came back.

Louis, who had created a mahjong computer game with his new girlfriend (Cherrie), received word that there would be a mahjong tournament sponsored by his game. The ever optimistic Andy decided to join the contest which saw him competing against Sean. Before the tournament began, he discovered that Gigi had returned to her old job as a flight attendant and gave him good fortune items from around the world. During the tournament, Andy was able to secure a seat in the final match which included Sean, Sean's father, and a henchman. Andy easily won the match but was confronted by Sean to have a rematch. Andy agreed and the two squared off. Before the match could end, Andy gave the prize to Sean. Sean, surprised, looked at Andy's hand, which was a major breakthrough set. Sean realized all his mistakes and decided to learn from Andy. Andy regained all his money and started a mahjong school by the sea. He eventually married Gigi.

Cast
 Andy Lau as Andy
 Gigi Leung as Gigi
 Sean Lau as Ching-wan (Sean)
 Louis Koo as Louis
 Cherrie Ying as Cherrie
 Wong Tin-lam as Ching-wan's Father
 Bonnie Wong Man-wai as Andy and Louis's Mother
 Angela Tong as Mahjong Player
 Wong Wah-wo as Mahjong Player 
 Lung Tin-sang as Fat Uncle's Man
 Hung Wai-leung as Fat Uncle's Man
 Yuen Ling-to as Fat Uncle's Man
 Four Tse Liu-shut
 Matt Chow

See also
Andy Lau filmography
Johnnie To filmography
Cinema of Hong Kong

External links
 
 Review 1
 Review 2
 Review 3

Hong Kong comedy films
2002 films
2000s Cantonese-language films
2002 comedy films
Films about gambling
China Star Entertainment Group films
Milkyway Image films
Films directed by Johnnie To
Films directed by Wai Ka-Fai
Films set in Hong Kong
Films shot in Hong Kong
Films with screenplays by Yau Nai-hoi
Films with screenplays by Wai Ka-fai
Works about mahjong
Chinese New Year films
2000s Hong Kong films